Angelo de Grassis (died 1449) was a Roman Catholic prelate who served as Archbishop of Reggio Calabria (1449–1453).

Biography
On 30 April 1449, Angelo de Grassis was appointed during the papacy of Pope Nicholas V as Archbishop of Reggio Calabria.
He served as Archbishop of Reggio Calabria until his death in 1453.

See also 
Catholic Church in Italy

References

External links and additional sources
 (for Chronology of Bishops) 
 (for Chronology of Bishops) 

Year of birth missing
1453 deaths
15th-century Roman Catholic archbishops in the Kingdom of Naples
Bishops appointed by Pope Nicholas V